Eduardo Herrera Riera (September 7, 1927 – October 27, 2012) was the Catholic bishop of the Diocese of Carora of Venezuela from 1994 until retirement in 2003.

Ordained to the priesthood in 1955, he was named Auxiliary Bishop of Cumaná in 1965,  Bishop of Guanare in 1966 and Auxiliary Bishop of Barquisimeto in 1970.

He retired in 2003.

Notes

1927 births
2012 deaths
Venezuelan Roman Catholic bishops
Venezuelan Roman Catholics
Roman Catholic bishops of Guanare
Roman Catholic bishops of Carora
Roman Catholic bishops of Barquisimeto
Roman Catholic bishops of Cumaná